Deep Creek Lake is the largest inland body of water in the U.S. state of Maryland. Like all lakes in Maryland, it is man-made. The lake is home to a wide variety of aquatic life, such as freshwater fish and aquatic birds. The Wisp Ski Resort is located nearby.

History
The lake is a result of the Youghiogheny Hydroelectric Company hydroelectric project on Deep Creek in the 1920s. Construction of the dam began in 1923 and was completed in 1925. The hydroelectric plant became operational at 4:00 p.m. on May 26, 1925. The state of Maryland purchased the lake in 2000 from the Pennsylvania Electric Company, and Deep Creek Lake State Park provides public access to the lake.

Fishing

Fish commonly caught by anglers include:

largemouth bass
smallmouth bass
rock bass
northern pike
walleye
yellow perch
brown trout
rainbow trout
chain pickerel
black crappie
bluegill
redear sunfish
common carp
shiners

See also
Deep Creek Lake State Park

References

External links

 Maryland Park Service Deep Creek Lake
 Deep Creek Lake Discovery Center
 Deep Creek Lake Chamber of Commerce

Reservoirs in Maryland
Rivers of Garrett County, Maryland

pl:Park stanowy Deep Creek Lake